The Church of SS Cosmas and Damian is a Roman Catholic church in Kaštel Gomilica, Croatia.

Sources
 

Churches in Croatia
Romanesque architecture in Croatia
12th-century Roman Catholic church buildings in Croatia
Buildings and structures in Split-Dalmatia County